Coffee varieties are the diverse subspecies derived through selective breeding or natural selection of coffee plants.  While there is tremendous variability encountered in both wild and cultivated coffee plants, there are a few varieties and cultivars that are commercially important due to various unique and inherent traits such as disease resistance and fruit yield.   These unique traits are what producers use to select breeds when developing crops.  Therefore, at a micro level, breed selection is critical to the success of a producer and is one of the key components of cup quality.

At a macro level, the viability of the coffee industry as a whole is dependent upon breed selection.  Already, the majority of coffee produced originates from producers using selected breeds.  For this reason, breed selection is an important aspect of sustainability within coffee production.

Terminology
There is considerable confusion as to which term to use when speaking about coffee subspecies. For the sake of clarity, within this article the terms will be used in accordance with loose guidelines put forth by the Specialty Coffee Association of America:

Variety: This rank of taxa delineates differences between plants that are smaller than in subspecies but larger than forms. A variety retains most of the characteristics of the species, but differs in some way.

Cultivar: Any variety produced by horticultural or agricultural techniques and not normally found in natural populations; a cultivated variety. Most of the varieties we know in specialty coffee are really cultivars. Bourbon and Typica are some of the most widely known cultivars.

Put simply: In this article, varieties are naturally occurring subspecies, and cultivars are cultivated subspecies. In addition, a third term, "breed" will be used as an umbrella term to simplify discussions in which the nuances between the terms 'variety' and 'cultivar' have no bearing.

History

Before the end of the 19th century, arabica was indeed the exclusive producer of all coffee in the world, but the first documented outbreak of coffee leaf rust (CLR) disease decimated crops around the world, prompting many farmers to explore alternative crops.

While some countries almost completely replaced coffee production with alternative crops, Indonesia began introducing robusta, which has both a high yield in fruit and a high level of resistance to CLR.  Unfortunately, robusta also produces lower quality coffee.  During the first half of the 20th century, East Java pioneered systematic breeding designs on robusta coffee, which would become "exemplary to all subsequent breeding programmes of robusta coffee in India and Africa."  This knowledge of robusta is critical for modern coffee breeding because robusta is the main source of pest and disease traits not found in arabica.

Prior to the mid-1900s, arabica coffee breeding involved simple line selection with an emphasis mostly on favorable adaptation to local growing conditions, fruit yield, and cup quality.   But in the late 1970s and 1980s, various countries started breeding programs designed to create cultivars resistant to CLR. The intensity of these later breeding programs was a direct response to the serious threat CLR posed to crops.  The results of these and other breeding programs have produced a number of important cultivars worth mentioning (see list below).

Selection criteria

Farmers have designed standards for crops they would cultivate. Recent advances in breeding techniques have provided farmers with higher-yielding breeds with better disease resistance and better cup quality—all traits critical to the success of a producer.  Below are some traits a producer may use to select breeds for crop development.

Cup quality refers to how well the seed or fruit itself tastes. This is considered the trait of the most importance.

Yield is the measure of the amount of fruit produced by a given breed.  It is usually expressed as kilograms or tonnes per hectare per year, assuming conventional plant densities of 1,100 - 1,400 trees per hectare. High yield is one of the prime objectives of producers, and breeding specifically to achieve higher yield is a relatively new trend.

Resistance to diseases has become a dominant factor in not only natural selection but also of breeding new cultivars.  Breeding for disease resistance has been mainly restricted to CLR and coffee berry disease (CBD) but also includes other diseases of locality.

Resistance to pests is not normally a trait developed by breeding, but is rather a trait selected from among breeds.  Certain breeds of coffee have been found to be resistant to nematodes and leaf miner.  As with diseases, robusta has been found to be the more resistant species compared to arabica.

For those who wish to grow coffee as a houseplant, and for growers who want plants that utilize the least amount of space (and therefore money) while still producing the greatest yield, small size of an individual plant is preferred.

The amount of caffeine matters to many, as caffeine has stimulating effects, but is detrimental in excessive amounts.

The maturation rate is the time that is required before a new plant will start producing fruit. An early maturation rate is desired.

Species

C. arabica

According to The International Trade Centre, Arabica coffee accounted for roughly 61 per cent of the world's coffee production between 2004 and 2010. It would be higher if Arabica were not as susceptible to disease as it is. Coffee from the species C. arabica has many different varieties, each with unique characteristics.

C. canephora (syn. C. robusta)

Vietnam is the world's largest Robusta producer, with Robusta accounting for 97% of Vietnam's coffee output.

While not separate varieties of bean, unusual and very expensive robustas are the Indonesian kopi luwak and the Philippine Kapéng Alamid and Kahawa Kubing. The beans are collected from the droppings of the common palm civet, whose digestive processes give it a distinctive flavor.

In the Philippines, a notable Robusta variety is Kahawa Sūg, also known as the "Sulu coffee". It has been produced in the Sulu archipelago since the 1860s.

Other species
Although not as commercially viable as Arabica or Robusta, other species of coffee exist and contain unique varieties. These include Kapeng barako or Café Baraco,, a Liberica variety grown in the Philippines, particularly in the provinces of Batangas and Cavite. It was introduced during the period of Spanish colonization and the Philippines quickly rose to become the 4th largest producer of coffee in the early 19th century. Production was cut short, however, due to "coffee rust" infestation. Coffea charrieriana is a caffeine-free coffee found in Cameroon.
Scientists from Kew Gardens rediscovered Coffea stenophylla in Sierra Leone. Previously stenophylla had not been seen in the wild since 1954, but in December 2018 Professor Jeremy Haggar, of the University of Greenwich, and Dr Aaron Davis of Kew Gardens travelled to the forests of Sierra Leone to seek it out. Stenophylla can grow at higher temperatures than Arabica and has a better flavour profile than Robusta.

Hybrids
Some varieties are hybrids of the above species.

List of cultivars

References

Coffee varieties
Lists of cultivars
Coffee production